Alain Quême, known professionally as Alan Braxe (born 9 July 1971), is a French electronic musician. He is most widely known for his collaborative work with the musicians Fred Falke and Kris Menace, and for being part of the musical trio Stardust. In 2005, he released The Upper Cuts, a collection of his previously released material. He is the cousin of French electronic musician DJ Falcon.

Biography

Alan Braxe started playing the clarinet and cello at an early age. In the late 1980s, he became a DJ in Paris. He started producing his own dance music using only a mixer, a compressor, and an Emu SP1200.

Within a year, Braxe's early demos attracted the attention of Thomas Bangalter, and Braxe's debut single, "Vertigo", was released in 1997 via Bangalter's Roulé label. In 1998, Braxe, Bangalter, and Benjamin Diamond decided to form collaborative project called Stardust, and their single "Music Sounds Better With You", which was released in the same year, was a hit, selling over 3 million copies.

Following this success, Braxe in 1999 inaugurated his own record label, Vulture, releasing collaborations with the DJ and producer Fred Falke. He also remixed for a crew of artists both popular and underground – a list that features Beyoncé, Test Icicles, and Ford and Lopatin. Over the next two decades, Braxe's production credits and own releases swelled to nearly 100 titles.

While approaching the 20th anniversary of Stardust's smash success and the Vulture's launch, Braxe stripped his studio of all things digital, and starts to experiment with a Buchla modular synthesizer, echoing his first setup's minimalism, resulting in a more stripped back, simple and sparse analogue electronic sound. This resulted in The Ascent EP, that was released in 2019, with four tracks.

In summer 2021, Alan Braxe, along with Henrik Olsen, released Another Life, under the alias Saudade, on Ministry of Sound Records. The track is produced by Hal Ritson (The Young Punx). The track is a throwback to the French House sounds of the late 90s.

In 2022, DJ Falcon and Alan Braxe debuted new music on a new record label Smugglers Way, an imprint of Domino, that intends to release new and old French house music from the duo and from other artists. In addition to this, the pair announced the two had begun making music as a duo named Braxe + Falcon - with their first single in March, their first EP in August, and a debut solo album intended for release in early 2023. Their debut single features vocals from Panda Bear. A rerelease of Braxe's compilation album The Upper Cuts will release from Smugglers Way in November.

Discography

Albums 
 The Upper Cuts – Alan Braxe & Friends (2005)
 Vulture Music Mixed By Alan Braxe (2007)
 TBA – Braxe + Falcon (2023)

EPs 
 Moments in Time EP – Alan Braxe with The Spimes (2013)
 The Ascent EP (2019)
 Silence at Sea (Inspired By ‘The Outlaw Ocean’ A Book By Ian Urbina) (2021)
 Step By Step EP – Braxe + Falcon (2022)

Singles 

"Vertigo" (1997)
Running – "Intro" / "Most Wanted" – Alan Braxe & Fred Falke (2000)
"Palladium" / "Penthouse Serenade" – Alan Braxe & Fred Falke (2002)
"Love Lost" – Alan Braxe & Fred Falke (2003)
Rubicon – "Rubicon" / "Arena" / "Chrystal City" – Alan Braxe & Fred Falke (2004)
"You'll Stay In My Heart" – Alan Braxe & Fred Falke feat. Savage (2005)
"Lumberjack" – Alan Braxe & Kris Menace (2007)
"Addicted" (2008)
"Nightwatcher (Show Me)" – Alan Braxe feat. Killa Kela & Fallon (2008)
"One More Chance" – Alan Braxe with The Spimes (2013)
"Bonus Beat One" (2013)
"Words" (2019)
"Step By Step" / "Creative Source" – Braxe + Falcon (2022)

Remix credits

Other songs

Other appearances

References

External links
 
 

Living people
French house musicians
Place of birth missing (living people)
Kitsuné artists
1973 births